Notable modern scholars in Buddhist studies

Eugène Burnouf (1801–1852)
Viggo Fausböll (1821–1908)
Robert Caesar Childers (1838–1876)
T.W. Rhys Davids (1843–1922)
Nanjo Bunyu (1849-1927)
Hermann Oldenberg (1854–1920)
Wilhelm Geiger (1856–1943)
C.A.F. Rhys Davids (1857–1942)
Robert Chalmers (1858–1938)
P. Lakshmi Narasu (1861-1934)
Takakusu Junjirō (1866–1945)
D.T. Suzuki (1870–1966)
Frank Lee Woodward (1871–1952)
Masaharu Anesaki (1873–1949)
Nyanatiloka Mahathera (1878-1957)
A. K. Coomaraswamy (1877–1947)
A. P. Buddhadatta Mahathera (1887–1962)
Benimadhab Barua (1888–1948)
Balangoda Ananda Maitreya Thero (1896-1998)
Isaline Blew Horner (1896–1981)
Gunapala Piyasena Malalasekera (1899–1973)
Nyanaponika Thera (1901-1994)
Edward Conze (1904–1979)
Ñāṇamoli Bhikkhu (1905-1960)
K. N. Jayatilleke (1920-1970)
John Crook (1930–2011)
Y. Karunadasa (b. 1934)
David Kalupahana (1936–2014)
Richard Gombrich (b. 1937)
P. D. Premasiri (b. 1941)
Robert Thurman (b. 1941)
L. S. Cousins (1942-2015)
Bhikkhu Bodhi (b. 1944)
Bernard Faure (b. 1948) 

K.L. Dhammajoti (b. 1949)
Steven Heine (b. 1950)
Damien Keown (b. 1951)
Masatoshi Ueki (b. 1951)
Donald S. Lopez Jr. (b. 1952)
Bhikkhu Analayo (b. 1962)
Vello Väärtnöu (b. 1951)
Pabbajjoravitipalivijjamuniyo (b. 1972)
Erick Tsiknopoulos (b. 1981)
Victor Sogen Hori
David Komito
Jan Nattier

See also 
 Pali Text Society
 List of Sāsana Azani recipients
 Mahachulalongkornrajavidyalaya University
 Mahamakut Buddhist University
 International Theravada Buddhist Missionary University
 State Pariyatti Sasana University, Yangon
 State Pariyatti Sasana University, Mandalay
 Dhammaduta Chekinda University
 Buddhist and Pali University of Sri Lanka
 Gautam Buddha University
 Sanchi University of Buddhist-Indic Studies
 Lumbini Buddhist University
 Chittagong Pali College
 Sitagu International Buddhist Academy
 International Buddhist Studies College
 Buddhist Institute, Cambodia
 Oxford Centre for Buddhist Studies
 List of Buddhist universities and colleges

References 

Shan State Buddhist University
Scholars
Buddhist
 
Indian scholars of Buddhism